The 2005–06 season was the 97th season in the Football League played by Barnsley F.C., a professional football club based in Barnsley, South Yorkshire, England.

Season summary 
Having appointed Andy Ritchie as manager after a successful spell as caretaker manager, the Reds started the season in mixed form, picking up 14 points in their first 11 games. A run of 10 games unbeaten followed, as Barnsley found themselves in 4th place and 3 points off the promotion places. Barnsley continued their strong form into the second half of the season, finishing fifth in the league, on 72 points. This meant Barnsley would face Yorkshire rivals Huddersfield Town in a play-off semi-final.

After losing the first leg at home 1–0 it appeared that Barnsley were resigned to another season in League One. However, Barnsley took the lead in the away leg, with Paul Hayes scoring a penalty after being fouled by Danny Schofield. Huddersfield went on to equalise but goals from captain Paul Reid and a 77th-minute winner from Daniel Nardiello meant Barnsley would be playing in the play-off final against Swansea City who had beaten third placed Brentford. This was also the first time in the history of the playoffs in all three divisions that a side had overturned a first leg deficit after losing the first leg at home.

The final was played at the Millennium Stadium, Cardiff on 27 May 2006 in front of a crowd of 55,419. Barnsley took the lead through a Paul Hayes opener but Swansea replied with goals from ex-Red Rory Fallon and Andy Robinson following a blunder by keeper Nick Colgan. A Barnsley equaliser came from a Daniel Nardiello free kick, but neither team could find a winner in either normal time or extra time, despite Swansea's Lee Trundle coming close late on. 

As the match was tied 2–2, it was decided on penalties, with Nick Colgan redeeming himself for his earlier mistake and saving Swansea's final penalty from Alan Tate, to give the Reds a 4–3 shootout victory and a place in the Championship.

Competitions

League One

Table

Match details

Play-offs

FA Cup

League Cup

Football League Trophy

Players

References 

Barnsley F.C. seasons
Barnsley